Sugar Land Regional Airport  is a city-owned public-use airport located in Sugar Land, Texas (USA),  southwest of the central business district of Houston.

Founded privately in the early 1950s as Hull Field, it was renamed in 1990, as Sugar Land Municipal Airport when acquired by the city. As of 2009 it is the fourth-largest airport within the Houston–Sugar Land–Baytown metropolitan area and serves as a "reliever" of traffic to this airport. It handles approximately 200 aircraft operations per day during typical years, which include corporate business jet and turboprop flights.

The airport today serves the area's general aviation (GA) aircraft, serving corporate, governmental, and private clientele.  It opened a new  Terminal in 2006 with a  GA complex, including 99 T-hangars in six buildings.

The City of Sugar Land maintains Cullinan Park, which occupies  of land directly north and west of the Sugar Land Regional Airport, blocking expansion. The airport is surrounded by Sugar Land homes, and there is a highway and rail road track directly south of the airport, which also block its expansion. The former Central Unit, a Texas Department of Criminal Justice prison for males, was closed in 2011. It occupied land zoned for airport expansion.

History

Dr. Donald "Doc" Hull was an oral surgeon who established a dental program for the Texas Department of Corrections in the early 1950s. Hull, who commuted across Southeast Texas to provide dental care to prisoners, originally operated aircraft to South Houston Airport and Sam Houston Airport. As it expanded, the City of Houston forced those airports to close. The former Sam Houston Airport was annexed as part of Houston's extraterritorial jurisdiction (ETJ) and became the Westbury area.

Hull decided to develop a regional airport more distant from Houston but to serve the area. In 1952, Hull landed his biplane in a field near Sugar Land. Afterward, with a loan from a friend, Hull purchased the property and developed a small airport.

The City of Sugar Land purchased Hull Field on December 18, 1990, and renamed the airport as "Sugar Land Municipal Airport." The City of Sugar Land opened an NFCT (non-federal control tower) that it funds and operates. This control tower manages traffic within  of Sugar Land Airport from 6:00 a.m. to 10:00 p.m. daily.

Past airline service 

Several commuter airlines operated scheduled passenger service into Sugar Land Regional over the years.  In the fall of 1979, Commutair was flying a "cross-town" shuttle service between the airport and Houston Intercontinental Airport (IAH), with de Havilland Canada DHC-6 Twin Otter twin turboprop aircraft operating up to twelve round-trip flights a day.

The Commutair service was replaced by Metro Airlines during the 1980s.  In the summer of 1983, Metro, operating as an independent air carrier, was flying up to nine round trips a day between Sugar Land and Houston Intercontinental with Twin Otter aircraft.  By early 1985, Metro Airlines had entered into a codesharing agreement with Eastern Air Lines and was flying Twin Otter aircraft as Eastern Express between the airport and IAH with up to eleven round trip flights a day.

In 1993, Austin-based Conquest Airlines announced it would begin intrastate flights from the airport to Austin (Mueller Airport), Dallas Love Field (DAL), and San Antonio. By 1994, Conquest had dropped flights to San Antonio but was still operating nonstops to Austin and Dallas. In 1995, the airline was operating three nonstop flights a day to Austin with Fairchild Swearingen Metroliner (Metro III model) propjets. By 1996, Conquest was no longer serving Sugar Land Regional.

The airport does not have any scheduled passenger airline flights at the present time.

Current name 

Sugar Land Regional Airport received its current name in October 2002.  The airfield was formerly known as Sugar Land Municipal Airport and Hull Field. It is the fourth-largest airport in Greater Houston as of 2009, receiving annual usage from private planes of more than 100 Fortune 500 companies. TXP, Inc. released a report identifying the airport as "foremost general reliever airport in the southwest sector" and "a catalyst for corporate commerce in the Greater Houston market including the Westchase District, Uptown, and Greenway Plaza."

The airport is the fourth-largest in the Houston area, serving as a reliever for William P. Hobby Airport. As of 2010, Sugar Land Regional is the third-busiest airport in Greater Houston by number of aircraft operations.

Facilities and aircraft 

For the 12-month period ending July 28, 2005, the airport had 90,758 aircraft operations, an average of 248 per day: 95% general aviation, 5% air taxi and less than 1% military. In August 2017, there were 139 aircraft based at this airport: 84 single-engine, 18 multi-engine, 34 jet and 3 helicopter.

The airport includes the former Stanford Aviation hangar, described by Mimi Swartz of Texas Monthly as "impeccably landscaped." Flights from the terminal went to Antigua.

US Customs and Border Protection has a small facility at the airport.

Gallery

References

External links

 Sugar Land Regional Airport
 The Economic Impact of Sugar Land Regional Airport

Sugar Land, Texas
Airports in Greater Houston
Transportation in Fort Bend County, Texas
Buildings and structures in Fort Bend County, Texas
Airports established in 1952
1952 establishments in Texas